Ceraadi were an American R&B-hip hop duo based in Los Angeles. Their debut EP, Ceraadi's Playlist, was released in 2019.

History
The group consisted of sisters Emaza Gibson, Saiyr Gibson, and Znui Gibson, who are originally from Cedar Rapids, Iowa. They are of Filipino, Irish, and African American descent.

They were signed to Jay-Z's Roc Nation label in 2019. Their five-track EP Ceraadi's Playlist was released on August 9, 2019. The lead single off of the EP "Loyal" was released on May 16, 2019. In September 2019, they released the music video for the EPs second single, "Dumbstruck."

On social media, the sisters vlog about fashion, beauty, music and relationship advice, gaining a following of over 1.9 million Instagram followers and 1.3 million YouTube subscribers as of March 2020. Their music and fashion style has been described as having elements of early 1990s R&B and hip-hop, with influences including TLC, Janet Jackson, and Salt-N-Pepa.

Members

Former
Emaza Gibson
Saiyr Gibson

Discography

EPs

Singles
 "What Ever" (2015)
"We In Here" (2017)
 "Kung Pao" (2018)
 "Active" (2018)
 "Loyal" (2019)
 "Dumbstruck" (2019)
 "That's What She'd Say" (2019)
 "Christmas With You" (2019)
 "Secure The Bag" (2020) 
 "BFF" (2020)

References 

Musical groups established in 2015
Roc Nation artists
Rhythm and blues duos
Hip hop duos
Female musical duos
American musical duos
Sibling musical duos
Musicians from Cedar Rapids, Iowa
American LGBT musicians
2015 establishments in Iowa